Open access to scholarly communication in Sweden is relatively widespread. In 2010 the Swedish Research Council began requiring its grantees to make research results available in open access form. Lund University Libraries and Stockholm University Press belong to the international Open Access Scholarly Publishers Association.

Content in academic repositories can be found by searching .

Repositories
There are a number of collections of scholarship in Sweden housed in digital open access repositories. They contain journal articles, book chapters, data, and other research outputs that are free to read. Swepub is the national database for scholarly publications in Sweden. Swepub aggregate scholarly output from a number of sources. One of the sources is the  platform.

Timeline

Key events in the development of open access in Sweden include the following:
 2001
 May: Swedish Wikipedia begins publication.
 October: Susning.nu Swedish language wiki begins publication. 
 2008
 February: Swedish University of Agricultural Sciences begins policy encouraging deposits in its institutional repository.
 2011
 March: Malmö University begins requiring deposits in its institutional repository.
 2016
 November: the Swedish Research Bill establishes that the National Library is responsible for activities concerning open access to scientific publications and that the Swedish Research Council is responsible for work on open access to research data. The two institutions must act in consultation with each other and with other bodies involved.

See also
 Internet in Sweden
 Education in Sweden
 Media of Sweden
Open access in other countries

References

Further reading
 
  
  (Case study of Bibsamkonsortiet (Swedish National Consortia)).

External links

 

Academia in Sweden
Communications in Sweden
Sweden
Publishing in Sweden
Science and technology in Sweden